Biranchi Barwa  is a village development committee (VDC) in Parsa District in the Narayani Zone of southern Nepal. At the time of the 2011 Nepal census it had a population of 3,625 people living in 558 individual households. There were 1,846 males and 1,779 females at the time of census.

From VDC Biranchi Barwa, Kathmandu is approx 300 km North. Nearest City from VDC Biranchi Barwa is Birgunj. Birgunj is just 3 km away from India's Border Raxaul. Village follows the panchayati system. Police station is established in the village.
Distance between birgunj to biranchibarba is 21 km.

Geography
Location  Nepal, South Asia, Asia

Latitide  27° 3' 32.7" (27.0591°) North

Longitude  84° 44' 18.3" (84.7384°) East

Average elevation  

Coordinates: 27.07°N 84.74°E

Transport

Public transport is available. For reaching Biranchi Barwa either you have to walk or hire a bullock cart.
Earlier reaching Biranchi Barwa was very tough as there was no road. Late Shri Chandrika Prasad Tiwari had made a road for visiting his farm house and nearest places like Pokharia and Satwaria. Later on he declared his personal path as Public path and same path is used by villagers of Biranchi Barwa for reaching Pokharia or Birgunj.

Education

Divya kanya Madhaymik vidhayalaya. This is Girl's School till SLC (STD 10)  (this school is donated and funded By foreigners.

Co-ed school till 5. (Land and building of school is Donated by Late Shri Shashidhar Tiwari)

 Hospital: (government Hospital)

Village has hospital running near road of kalika Mai temple. New Hospital is functional from the year 2013. Nearest Vet Hospital is in Pokhariya and Birgunj.

Economy

Every Tuesday and Friday Villagers organize a vegetables, meat and fish market inside the village. Nearby villagers come and purchase/sell the vegetables, fish and meat.

The economy of the village is mainly based on agriculture and Animal Husbandry.

Religion

Biranchi Barwa has few temples and two of them are very famous. These two temples are “Maa Durga Temple” and  “Kalika Mai Temple” . Maa Durga Temple is situated in the heart of the village. Every year during “Durga Puja” (Dashain) , a Mela (Fair) is organized.

Kalika Mai Temple  is believed to be oldest temple of Biranchi Barwa. Kalika Mai temple is situated at outskirt of Biranchi Barwa. It’s situated near Biranchi Barwa’s Football ground and river. Every year during "kalika mai in chaitra ram nami,

Sport
Children’s of VDC Biranchi Barwa actively participate in sports like Cricket,Khusti and football. Villagers had won several matches, awards and accolades in cricket,football and Khusti.

References

Populated places in Parsa District